Mitrea Cocor is a 1953 Romanian war drama film directed by Victor Iliu and Marieta Sadova. It is based on the 1949 socialist realist novel of the same name by Mihail Sadoveanu. A poor young Romanian goes off to fight during the Second World War, and returns home at the same time as the Red Army advances into the country.

Cast
 Toma Dimitriu
 Constantin Ramadan 
 Cornel Rusu 
 Marieta Sadova 
 Dem Savu 
 Septimiu Sever 
 Aurelia Sorescu 
 Ion Talianu 
 Nicolae Tomazoglu 
 George Manu 
 Andrei Codarcea 
 Vasile Lazarescu 
 Nucu Paunescu 
 Titus Laptes 
 Maria Voluntaru 
 Gheorghe Ionescu-Gion 
 Ion Henter

References

Bibliography 
 Liehm, Mira & Liehm, Antonín J. The Most Important Art: Eastern European Film After 1945. University of California Press, 1977.

External links 
 

1953 films
1953 drama films
Romanian drama films
1950s Romanian-language films
Romanian World War II films
Films directed by Victor Iliu
Romanian political films
Romanian black-and-white films